This is a list of events in 2010s in Angola:

2010
 8 January - Togo national football team bus attack. Whilst being escorted by Angolan forces through the disputed territory of Cabinda, the team bus of the Togo national football team was attacked by gunmen as it travelled to the 2010 Africa Cup of Nations tournament. The ensuing gunfight resulted in the deaths of the assistant coach, team spokesman and bus driver, as well as injuring several others. 

An offshoot of the Front for the Liberation of the Enclave of Cabinda (FLEC) claimed responsibility. Rodrigues Mingas, secretary general of the FLEC-Military Position (FLEC-PM), said that his fighters had meant to attack security guards as the convoy passed through Cabinda. "This attack was not aimed at the Togolese players but at the Angolan forces at the head of the convoy," Mingas told France 24 television. "So it was pure chance that the gunfire hit the players. We don't have anything to do with the Togolese and we present our condolences to the African families and the Togo government. We are fighting for the total liberation of Cabinda."

2011
 February, March, November - Demonstrations are held against President José Eduardo dos Santos by young people, mostly via social media.

2012
 31 August - The MPLA wins the 2012 Angolan legislative election.

2017
 25 August 2017 - The MPLA wins the 2017 Angolan legislative election, receiving 61% of the votes according to the Angolan electoral commission.

References